FIFA: Road to World Cup 98 (commonly abbreviated to FIFA 98) is a football simulation video game developed by EA Canada and released by Electronic Arts in 1997. It is the fifth game in the FIFA series and the second to be in 3D on the fifth generation of video game consoles. A number of different players were featured on the cover, including David Beckham in the UK, Roy Lassiter in the United States, Mexico and Brazil, David Ginola in France, Raúl in Spain and Portugal, Paolo Maldini in Italy, and Andreas Möller in Germany. FIFA 98 was the last FIFA game released for the Sega Genesis, Sega Saturn and the Super Nintendo Entertainment System (SNES).

Game features 
The game includes an official soundtrack, team and player customisation options, 16 stadiums, improved artificial intelligence and the Road to World Cup mode, with all 172 FIFA-registered national teams that took part in qualification for the 1998 FIFA World Cup (including Brazil and France, who qualified for the tournament automatically as holders and hosts respectively). No subsequent edition of the FIFA series attempted to replicate FIFA 98s inclusion of every FIFA national team, until 2010 FIFA World Cup South Africa, which included all 199 FIFA nations that took part in qualifying. Players have individual faces.

FIFA 98 features many accurate team rosters, including national reserves for national call-up when playing in the round-robin qualification modes. In addition, 11 leagues are featured, containing 189 clubs. The game also features a five-a-side indoor mode and was the first FIFA game to contain an in-game player/team editor.

For the first time in a FIFA game, the offside rule is properly implemented. In previous games, when a player was in an offside position doing anything except running, that player was penalised for offside even when the ball was passed backwards. The Windows, PlayStation, Nintendo 64, and Saturn versions of FIFA 98 correct this so that the game only awards a free kick for offside if the ball is passed roughly to where the player in the offside position is.

Soundtrack 
The theme music for the game was Blur's "Song 2". Four songs from The Crystal Method are included – "More", "Now Is the Time", "Keep Hope Alive" and "Busy Child" – as well as a song by Electric Skychurch entitled "Hugga Bear". Des Lynam was retained for the game introduction and John Motson and Andy Gray remained as match commentators.

Development 
The game was built on the FIFA '97 engine. David Ginola served as the game's motion capture actor.

Reception 

FIFA: Road to World Cup 98 was positively received. Though widely regarded as still inferior to International Superstar Soccer 64, most critics considered it a strong comeback from its predecessor, FIFA 97 / FIFA Soccer 64. Moreover, a few reviewers said that the game's extensive licensing of real players and teams was a strong advantage over International Superstar Soccer 64 which, though not enough to make it an overall better game, was a compelling enough reason for soccer fans to get both games. Next Generation, for example, concluded that "The game still doesn't have the fluidity of ISS 64, but the real players and variety of options make FIFA RTTWC 64 a game that soccer fans all over the world should enjoy." GamePro disagreed with the majority comparison to International Superstar Soccer 64, assessing FIFA 98 as "a super-fun title, easily topping International Superstar Soccer 64 in overall gameplay."

Other common subjects of critical praise were the accuracy and variation in the play-by-play commentary, the detailed rendering of the player models, the smooth animations, the wealth of play options, and the realistic moves. GameSpot commented, "From header lobs, header shots, and high volleys, to hip checks, hyperaggressive lunges, and slide tackles, the range of movement and playing style is enormous." However, critics widely mentioned weaknesses in the A.I., particularly the goalie A.I., and occasional drops in frame rate.

IGN stated in their review of the Nintendo 64 version, "EA seems to have learned its lesson and made use of some of the N64's unique features instead of treating the N64 the same way as PCs or the PSX." Electronic Gaming Monthlys Kelly Rickards said that the PlayStation version "doesn't quite have the magic that the N64 version provides" but is still the best soccer game for the PlayStation to date. GamePro also declared it the best PlayStation soccer game to date, particularly citing the "slick new passing cursor", fast gameplay, and stunning graphics. The Saturn version was much less well-received; most reviews, though still positive, identified problems which did not exist in other versions of the game. GameSpot, for example, noted that the commentary often lagged behind the action in the Saturn version alone. Dan Hsu of Electronic Gaming Monthly complained of flat stadiums, broken player models, and a slow frame rate, and added, "Now, normally graphics are a secondary concern for me (gameplay, replay and all the other good stuff is way more important), but when the market has so many great soccer games, you need to make them look good." His three co-reviewers agreed that the game should have been better but nonetheless felt it held up well against the competition. By contrast, Sega Saturn Magazine panned the game, remarking that "With the infinitely superior SWWS '98 already available, it defies logic that anyone would purchase EA's latest lacklustre addition to the ailing FIFA series."

Upon its release, the game was a bestseller in the UK for two months. At the 1999 Milia festival in Cannes, it took home a "Gold" prize for revenues above €37 million in the European Union during the previous year.

During the game's 20th anniversary in 2017, Luke Plunkett of Kotaku wrote an essay arguing that FIFA 98 should be considered as the best sports video game of all time, focusing on its then-unprecedented depth and breadth of content, which Plunkett contended is the main differentiating factor between titles within the highly incremental sports video gaming industry. Examples cited were its inclusion of all FIFA national teams of the time, customization options for rosters and kits, multiple game modes, and groundbreaking soundtrack including licensed rather than original music.

References

External links 

1997 video games
1998 FIFA World Cup
Electronic Arts games
1998
Association football video games
Game Boy games
Nintendo 64 games
PlayStation (console) games
Sega Genesis games
Sega Saturn games
Super Nintendo Entertainment System games
THQ games
Tiertex Design Studios games
Video games developed in Canada
Windows games
EA Sports games
Video games set in 1996
Video games set in 1997
Video games set in 1998
D.I.C.E. Award for Sports Game of the Year winners